The Whipsnakes Lacrosse Club is a professional men's field lacrosse team in Premier Lacrosse League (PLL). The Whipsnakes are one of the six founding members of the PLL and the winner of its first two championships; the 2019 season and the 2020 Championship Tournament. Notable players include Matt Rambo, Jake Bernhardt, Michael Ehrhardt, and Zed Williams.

Roster

(C) indicates captain
Source:

*Indicates player is on Unavailable to Travel list

**Indicates player is on PUP list

Coaching staff
 Head coach – Jim Stagnitta
 Assistant coach – Mike Murphy
 Assistant coach – Brian Grady

All-time draft selections
2019

2020 Entry Draft

The 2020 player entry draft occurred on March 16 for teams to select players arriving from rival Major League Lacrosse. On March 4, Paul Burmeister and NBCSN hosted an entry draft lottery for selection order. Out of 100 balls to select from, Waterdogs had 40, Chrome had 25, Atlas had 15, Archers had 10, Chaos had 6, Redwoods had 3, and the champion Whipsnakes had 1.

Rob Pannell was announced to be transferring to the PLL on March 9, followed by 15 other players the following day, which comprised the selection pool for the entry draft. A total of 14 players were selected in the entry draft with remaining new players entering the league player pool.

2020 College Draft

2021 Entry Draft

2021 College Draft

2022 College Draft

Season results

PLL Award winners
Jim Brown Most Valuable Player
 Matt Rambo: 2019
 Zed Williams: 2020
Eamon McEneaney Attackman of the Year
 Matt Rambo: 2019
 Zed Williams: 2020
Dave Pietramala Defensive Player of the Year
 Matt Dunn: 2020
Oren Lyons Goalie of the Year

 Kyle Bernlohr, 2022

Brodie Merrill Long Stick Midfielder of the Year
 Michael Ehrhardt: 2019, 2020, 2021, 2022
Paul Cantabene Faceoff Athlete of the Year
 Joe Nardella: 2020
George Boiardi Short Stick Midfielder of the Year
 Ty Warner: 2020

Head coaches

All-time record vs. PLL Clubs

References

See also

Premier Lacrosse League teams
Lacrosse clubs established in 2019